Lectionary 153, designated by siglum ℓ 153 (in the Gregory-Aland numbering) is a Greek manuscript of the New Testament, on parchment leaves. Paleographically it has been assigned to the 14th century.

Description 

The codex contains Lessons from the Acts and Epistles from Easter to Pentecost lectionary (Apostolarion) with lacunae at the beginning and end.
It is written in Greek minuscule letters, on 118 parchment leaves (21.3 cm by 16.7 cm), with one column and 21-22 lines per page. It was supplied by some cotton paper at the end.

History 

The manuscript was examined by Paul Martin and Gregory. Gregory assigned it by 30a.

The manuscript is not cited in the critical editions of the Greek New Testament (UBS3).

Currently the codex is located in the National Library of France (Gr. 373).

See also 

 List of New Testament lectionaries
 Biblical manuscript
 Textual criticism

Notes and references 

Greek New Testament lectionaries
14th-century biblical manuscripts
Bibliothèque nationale de France collections